Karlsøy is an island municipality in Troms og Finnmark county, Norway. The administrative centre of the municipality is the village of Hansnes. Other villages include Dåfjord, Hessfjord, Karlsøya, Torsvåg, Vannvåg, and Vannareid. The municipality is made up of many islands including Ringvassøya, Reinøya, Vannøya, Karlsøya, and Rebbenesøya plus several uninhabited islands (many of which were formerly inhabited). Some of the currently uninhabited islands include Helgøya, Nordkvaløya, Grøtøya, and Nord-Fugløya.

The  municipality is the 103rd largest by area out of the 356 municipalities in Norway. Karlsøy is the 268th most populous municipality in Norway with a population of 2,179.

General information
Karlsøy was established as a municipality on 1 January 1838 (see the formannskapsdistrikt law). On 1 January 1867, the southern Ullsfjord district of Karlsøy (population: 862) was transferred from Karlsøy to the neighboring Lyngen Municipality. On 1 September 1886, the western island district (population: 828) was separated from Karlsøy to become the new municipality of Helgøy. This left Karlsøy with 1,334 inhabitants.

During the 1960s, there were many municipal mergers across Norway due to the work of the Schei Committee. On 1 January 1964, the municipality of Helgøy was merged back into the municipality of Karlsøy. At the same time, all of the mainland areas of Karlsøy (the northern part of the Lyngen peninsula, with 1,001 inhabitants) was transferred from Karlsøy to neighboring Lyngen Municipality. After all the changes, the new Karlsøy had 3,414 residents. On 1 January 2008, the southern part of the island of Reinøya was transferred from Tromsø Municipality to Karlsøy Municipality.

On 1 January 2020, the municipality became part of the newly formed Troms og Finnmark county. Previously, it had been part of the old Troms county.

Name
The municipality (originally the parish) is named after the small Karlsøya island since the first Karlsøy Church was built there. The first element is the genitive case of the male name . Prior to 1909, the name was spelled Karlsø.

Coat of arms
The coat of arms was granted on 12 December 1980. The official blazon is "Azure, an eagle head erased argent". This means the arms have a blue field (background) and the charge is the head of a white-tailed eagle. The eagle head has a tincture of argent which means it is commonly colored white, but if it is made out of metal, then silver is used. The blue color in the field symbolizes the importance of the sea to the island community. The eagle head was chosen since one of Europe's largest colonies of these birds is found on the island of Nord-Fugløya in the municipality. Furthermore, the eagle symbolizes the importance of fishing for the municipality. The arms were designed by Hallvard Sandvik.

Churches
The Church of Norway has one parish within the municipality of Karlsøy. It is part of the Tromsø domprosti (arch-deanery) in the Diocese of Nord-Hålogaland.

Economy
Karlsøy is among the world's most important exporters of dried and salted cod, with Portugal, Spain, and Brazil among the main markets. The population is almost totally dependent on fishing. There are also goat herding businesses and some musicians that live on the island. There is also some tourism, including a festival that runs in the Summer. There are plans for 50 holiday homes to be built on the isle.

Geography and nature

The municipality consists of islands only. Ringvassøya, Norway's sixth largest island, is the largest island in the municipality. Nordkvaløya, Helgøya, Karlsøya, Vanna (Vannøya), Reinøya, and Rebbenesøya are the other major islands.
 
The islands of Rebbenesøy and Ringvassøy are split (as was Reinøya before 2008), with the southern part belonging to neighboring Tromsø municipality. The reason is that the borders were drawn when boat was the only means of transportation; then it made sense that the southern parts of the islands belonged to Tromsø while the northern parts belonged to Karlsøy. Today, when roads have replaced the boats, the situation is awkward, which is why the Norwegian government transferred all of Reinøy to the municipality of Karlsøy on 1 January 2008.

Karlsøya, the little island after which the municipality is named, has a village with the 19th century Karlsøy Church. The inhabitants include the original inhabitants, hippies, and Norwegian Muslims.

Helgøya, the former seat of the independent municipality of Helgøy in the western part of present Karlsøy, is today a more or less abandoned village of wooden houses and the old Helgøy Church. The island can only be reached when services are celebrated in the church, and ferry rides are organized.

Lake Skogsfjordvatn, in the centre of Ringvassøy, is a lake with some fishing, surrounded by sub-Arctic forests. This is Norway's largest lake in an island. The island of Vannøya has several villages, including Burøysund and Torsvåg, the latter offering views of the Atlantic from the Torsvåg Lighthouse.

Climate
Karlsøy mostly has a subpolar oceanic climate. Torsvåg lighthouse has been recording temperature sine 1933, and is situated on the northwestern tip of Vanna island. The eastern and inland part of the islands will have slightly warmer summers and slightly colder winters. The record low at Torsvåg is  recorded January 1979. The record high  is from July 1966. The average date for the last overnight freeze (low below ) in spring is 6 May and average date for first freeze in autumn is 25 October giving a frost-free season of 171 days (1981-2010 average for Torsvåg).

Government
All municipalities in Norway, including Karlsøy, are responsible for primary education (through 10th grade), outpatient health services, senior citizen services, unemployment and other social services, zoning, economic development, and municipal roads. The municipality is governed by a municipal council of elected representatives, which in turn elect a mayor.  The municipality falls under the Nord-Troms District Court and the Hålogaland Court of Appeal.

Municipal council
The municipal council  of Karlsøy is made up of 17 representatives that are elected to four year terms. The party breakdown of the council is as follows:

Mayors
The mayors of Karlsøy:

1838–1841: Nils Jønsberg 
1841–1845: Ole Ulrich Berg 
1846–1849: Hans Julius Knudsen  
1850–1855: Anders Selquist 
1856–1860: Fredrik Altmann 	
1861–1862: Anders Selquist 
1863–1864: Ole Rasmussen Bræk  
1865–1866: Ole Jørgen Falch 
1867-1867: Hans Martin Høegh  
1869–1873: Stener Johannes Tandberg  
1874–1898: Adolf Martin Helberg  
1899–1903: Alfred Eriksen (V)
1904–1919: Martin Simonsen (Ap)
1920–1922: Peder Dahl (V)
1923–1924: Martin Simonsen (Ap)
1925–1928: Anton B. Haugjord (Ap)
1929–1931: Mikal Petersen (Ap)
1932–1934: Anton B. Haugjord (Ap)
1935–1937: Sivert Nordeide (Ap)
1937–1941: Arthur Sandvik (V)
1941–1944: Sverre Hoel (NS)
1945-1945: Alv Gaasland (NS)
1945–1947: Arthur Sandvik (V)
1947–1950: Olav Simonsen (Ap)
1950–1960: Birger Aspenes (Ap)
1960–1961: Johannes Johnsen (Ap)
1961–1969: Harald Larsen (LL)
1969–1983: Otto Klemetsen (Ap)
1983–1987: Jan Hugo Sørensen (Ap)
1987–1999: Thor Tøllefsen (Sp)
1999-2003: Hanny Ditlefsen (Ap)
2003-2007: Thor Tøllefsen (Kp)
2007-2011: Bent Gabrielsen (Ap)
2011-2015: Hanny Ditlefsen (Ap)
2015–present: Mona Benjaminsen (LL)

Transportation
The municipal centre is at Hansnes, which can be reached through an undersea tunnel from Tromsø, and the drive is about one hour. From here ferries depart to Vannøy, Reinøy, and Karlsøy. The Langsund Tunnel is under construction and was planned to be completed by 2015, but it is currently on hiatus. It is expected to connect the islands of Reinøya and Ringvassøy. The few inhabitants of Rebbenesøy are served by a ferry from Mikkelvik on the western side of Ringvassøy.

Attractions
Karlsøy attractions include:
 The island of Nord-Fugløya, one of Norway's major bird cliffs, including puffin colonies.
 Fugløykalven Lighthouse, northwest of Nord-Fugløya
The island can only be reached in the cloudberry season, when picking expeditions are organized from Burøysund.

Notable people 
 Karl Marthinsen (1896 in Karlsøy – 1945) the Norwegian commander of Statspolitiet during the Nazi occupation in WWII
 Solvejg Eriksen (1903 in Karlsøy – 1993) a Norwegian journalist, author and women's rights activist
 Marthe Kristoffersen (born 1989 in Vannøya) a cross-country skier, competed at the 2010 Winter Olympics

References

External links

Municipal fact sheet from Statistics Norway 

 http://karlsoyfestival.com/

 
Municipalities of Troms og Finnmark
1838 establishments in Norway